Willy Pfister (1 March 1928 – 14 January 2015) was a Swiss professional ice hockey player who competed for the Swiss national team at the 1952 Winter Olympics.

References

External links
 

1928 births
2015 deaths
Ice hockey players at the 1952 Winter Olympics
Olympic ice hockey players of Switzerland
Swiss ice hockey left wingers